Andrew Chan Chak  (2 April 1894 – 31 August 1949) was a Chinese admiral of the Republic of China Navy, best known for his role in a breakout in five Royal Navy torpedo boats from the Japanese occupation of Hong Kong on Christmas Day 1941.

Career

A native of Hainan, Chan was a Midshipman in Canton city (now "Guangzhou") during the final years of the Qing Dynasty when he became a committed republican. Throughout the Warlord Era he participated in several naval engagements in Southern China. In 1923 he was appointed Commander-in-Chief of the Guangdong Fleet, later renamed the 4th Fleet of the ROC Navy.

At the beginning of the Second Sino-Japanese War Chan was given the additional position of Commander of the Fortresses of Humen; during a battle there in 1938 his left leg was wounded which eventually necessitated its amputation.

In 1939 Chan, then a Rear Admiral, was sent to Hong Kong as Liaison Officer of the Nationalist Government. Under the cover as a stockbroker, he arranged for the transportation of materiel into China despite the Japanese blockade, and at the same time liaised with British colonial authorities, keeping the local Chinese population on-side, controlling the Triad gangs and identifying Japanese sympathisers.

On 8 December 1941 the Battle of Hong Kong began; on Christmas Day the Governor, Sir Mark Aitchison Young, informed Chan of his intention to surrender to the Japanese. Chan decided to flee Hong Kong, and was given command of the five remaining Royal Navy Motor Torpedo Boats. In Aberdeen Harbour he and his entourage boarded the motor launch Cornflower II; while on the way to a rendezvous with the torpedo boats waiting south of Ap Lei Chau it was fired upon by Japanese forces. Chan ordered “Abandon Ship”, threw off his artificial leg, only to be shot at the left wrist; barely able to swim with one arm and one leg (he gave his life jacket to his bodyguard, who did not know how to swim), he was dragged ashore by his aide-de-camp, Lieutenant-Commander Henry Hsu. The torpedo boats came to their rescue, then headed towards Mirs Bay at high speed. From there the escapees, with the help of Chinese guerrillas, walked for four days through Japanese-occupied territories towards Huizhou in unoccupied China.

Altogether sixty-eight British, Chinese and Danish intelligence, naval and marine personnel were saved in the breakout, including David Mercer MacDougall, who had worked with Chan on intelligence matters. For aiding in the escape of these British military personnel, Chan was made an honorary Knight Commander of the Order of the British Empire on 19 August 1942.

From September 1945 to June 1946, Chan was the Mayor of Guangzhou. He died in Guangzhou on 31 August 1949, during the final weeks of the Chinese Civil War, officially from a stomach ulcer, although there was speculation that he was poisoned by agents of Chiang Kai-Shek.

References

1894 births
1949 deaths
People of the Northern Expedition
Mayors of Guangzhou
People from Hainan
Republic of China Navy admirals
Chinese military personnel of World War II
Admirals of World War II
Qing dynasty military personnel
History of Hong Kong
Battle of Hong Kong
Knights Commander of the Order of the British Empire